Brugha is a surname. Notable people with the surname include:

Caitlín Brugha (1879–1959), Irish Sinn Féin politician
Cathal Brugha (1874–1922), Irish revolutionary and politician
Ruairí Brugha (1917–2006), Irish Republican and IRA volunteer who became a Fianna Fáil politician

See also
Cathal Brugha Barracks, Irish Army barracks in Rathmines, Dublin
Cathal Brugha Street, street on the northside of Dublin, Ireland

de:Brugha